Micurus is a genus of beetles in the family Cerambycidae, containing the following species:

 Micurus affinis Breuning, 1975
 Micurus asperipennis Fairmaire, 1896
 Micurus obliquatus Fairmaire, 1903

References

Acanthocinini